Kutty is 2010 Indian Tamil-language romantic action-drama film directed by Mithran Jawahar, who with the project, recombines with the lead actor following the success of their previous venture. The film stars Dhanush, Shriya Saran and Sameer Dattani (in his Tamil debut) with Radha Ravi playing a pivotal role. The film, a remake of the Telugu film Arya (2004), has Gemini Film Circuit as the producers, whilst Devi Sri Prasad handled the music composition. The film, which was under production for a year, was released on 14 January 2010 coinciding with the Tamil festival of Thai Pongal for mixed to positive reviews, become a decent hit at the box office and completed its 50 days of theatrical run.

Plot

At the Kanyakumari beach, Geetha (Shriya Saran) looks at a lonely lying personal diary where she enjoys a poem written in it. She admires the poem by relying on the same page. While she and her friend admire the beauty of the sunrise, she accidentally loses one of her anklets (it falls in the sea). She sees a person jumping in after it, and she perceives him to have died in the waters. The incident haunts her in her dream again and again, and she feels very guilty for it. Back to the present in Chennai, Geetha eventually meets a rich, handsome boy Arjun (Sameer Dattani), in her college, who impresses her to win her love. He proposes to her and threatens her to love him or else he would die by jumping from the college rooftop. Already feeling guilty for being the cause of a person's death, not willing to let it happen again, Geetha accepts his love and screams "I love you" in front of the entire college to Arjun, which was witnessed by Kutty (Dhanush).

Kutty proposes his love for Geetha in front of Arjun, which shocks Geetha and annoys Arjun. Geetha turns down his request again and again and reminds him of her relationship with Arjun. However, Kutty instead tells her that it is not an issue to him and tells her to continue loving Arjun and he would never stop loving her. Arjun is irritated by Kutty's acting. He fights with him in order to bully him into stopping but instead was challenged by Kutty that if Arjun is confident in his love, no one would separate Geetha from him. Arjun finds no option but to accept in order to prove his confidence in his love (else accept that his love is weak). Kutty pulls all kind of stunts to impress Geetha (including winning a rigged race in order to protect Geetha's chastity from Arjun) but fails to make her accept his love.

Meanwhile, Arjun introduces Geetha to his father (Radha Ravi) expecting him to approve and bless their marriage, but his father, seeing to further his political ambitions, engages a minister's daughter (who is shown to be a spoilt girl of questionable character) for Arjun. So Arjun escapes with Geetha, who is helped by Kutty. Kutty, Arjun, Geetha are chased by Arjun's father's men but are unable to catch them. Meanwhile, old wounds renew between Kutty and Arjun. After an intense (kung-fu) fight with the henchmen (where Arjun runs and Kutty fights), Arjun leaves Geetha with Kutty without saying anything to either of them. Kutty takes care of Geetha, which touches her. She soon realizes the love he has for her and regrets not having met him before her commitment to Arjun. She tries telling the same to him, but Kutty, thinking that Geetha is scolding him, closes his ears and does not hear what she actually said to him (he does that a couple of times in the movie).

Arjun arrives at the scene with his father in tow, now all happy for their marriage. Geetha leaves with Arjun to marry him. On the wedding day of Arjun and Geetha, Kutty wanders here and there to look after wedding-related works. His friends understand his internal pain and slap him, begging him to cry at least now. While Geetha is on her way to the ceremony, Kutty stops her and openly expresses his pain of his love and how he is going to miss her and asks if his love did touch her at least once, without knowing that his love touched her already. He then laughs and passes it off as a prank. Geetha stares speechless with helplessness. Kutty's kid friends present Geetha with a gift from Kutty. The gift turns out to be Geetha's lost anklet and the poem page where she wrote a reply while she was in Kanyakumari. Kutty was the person who jumped into the sea to take her anklet and was assumed dead by Geetha. Geetha finally realizes her love for Kutty, rejects her marriage with Arjun, and goes to Kutty and accepts his love finally by hugging him.

Cast
 Dhanush as Kutty, a believer in and propagator of one-sided love. He is an orphan and is shown to be generous and caring, especially where his lover is concerned.
 Shriya Saran as Geethanjali, a college student who becomes the target of two men's affections: Arjun's and Kutty's.
 Sameer Dattani (credited as Dhyan) as Arjun Devanayagam, the college troublemaker who is popular as his father is a minister. He goes to great lengths to get what he desires.
 Radha Ravi as Devanayagam, Arjun's father, a minister who thinks only of his political career.
 Srinath as Arjun's right-hand man.
 Vincent Asokan as Muthu
 Rajyalakshmi as Geetha's mother, who arrives to console her daughter.
 Aarthi as Kutty's best friend, a tomboy by nature who dresses and acts, to a great extent, like a boy, such that she is treated as one.
 Mayilsamy as Paramasivam, the railway ticket checker who provides a brief moment of humor during the train ride.
 Swati Bhatia as Shruthi, Geetha's friend.
 Meghna Naidu in an item number "Kannu Rendum".

Production
Mithran Jawahar first started working on the remake of the Telugu film Arya (2004) in December 2004, but the project was later indefinitely put on hold.

In January 2008, Gemini Film Circuits bought the remake rights of the Telugu film Arya and claimed to be ready to produce a film with Dhanush and Shriya Saran in the lead role, with Balasekaran being named as a director. However, the film remained inactive for nearly a year until following the success of Yaaradi Nee Mohini, Mithran Jawahar was signed up to replace Balasekaran. The film was launched and titled Kadhir, but eventually went through a change of name to become Kutty. The film, launched in December 2008 and shooting proceeded in a number of schedules with filming taking place in Chennai, Vishakhapatnam and Kodaikanal. During the production of the film, it was acquired to be distributed by Sun Pictures, however the deal late fell through but the film eventually released during the Pongal festival on 14 January 2010.

Soundtrack
The soundtrack consisted primarily of recycled tunes from the original Telugu film by music director Devi Sri Prasad. "Aa Ante Amalapuram" was replaced with "Kannu Rendum" which was reused from Devi's other Telugu song "Yenthapani" from Telugu film King (2008) however other tunes were retained from the original. The film's soundtrack was released 23 December 2009. People who were present at the small function were A. Jawahar, Devi Sri Prasad and the producers .

Release

Critical reception
Upon release, the film generally received mixed reviews. A reviewer from Rediff gave the film 2.5 out of 5, claiming that the film is a "fun ride" and despite seeming to be the "same old story" with a "predictable end", he adds, "you're glued to the screen because of the intriguing plot twists". Sify describes the film as a "clean entertainer", citing that the film works "as it is a clean, honest, romantic musical that's worth a matinee for the family audiences", though it isn't "without hiccups" as it "lacks comedy" and could have needed some editing works in the second half. Similarly a reviewer from Times of India also described the film as a "clean entertainer" and praised director Jawahar, citing that he "deserves a round of applause", while criticizing the narration that "appears like a lecture students term as 'blade'" and the climax that "has happened in only a 1000 other movies". Behindwoods gave the film 2 out of 5 and cites that the film is "definitely different from the regular commercial" and that "the director has tried hard to make a feel good romantic flick and has partially succeeded".

Box office
The film opened in Malaysia at eleventh place in the box office.

Home media
The satellite rights of the film were sold to Sun TV.

References

External links
 Kuttymovies Collection
 Kutty Movies Collections | Download Kuttymovies HD Tamil Movies | Kuttymovies 2020 | Latest Website News
 

Tamil remakes of Telugu films
2010 films
Indian romantic action films
2010s Tamil-language films
Films shot in Visakhapatnam
Films directed by Mithran R. Jawahar